Communauté d'agglomération du Pays de Grasse is an intercommunal structure, centred on the city of Grasse. It is located in the Alpes-Maritimes department, in the Provence-Alpes-Côte d'Azur region, southeastern France. It was created in January 2014. Its seat is in Grasse. Its area is 489.9 km2. Its population was 101,594 in 2017, of which 50,396 in Grasse proper.

Composition
The communauté d'agglomération consists of the following 23 communes:

Amirat
Andon
Auribeau-sur-Siagne
Briançonnet
Cabris
Caille
Collongues
Escragnolles
Gars
Grasse
Le Mas
Mouans-Sartoux
Les Mujouls
Pégomas
Peymeinade
La Roquette-sur-Siagne
Saint-Auban
Saint-Cézaire-sur-Siagne
Saint-Vallier-de-Thiey
Séranon
Spéracèdes
Le Tignet
Valderoure

References

Grasse
Grasse